French Drove and Gedney Hill  was a station on the Great Northern and Great Eastern Joint Railway near Gedney Hill in south Lincolnshire on the line between Spalding and March.

References

External links
 French Drove and Gedney Hill station on navigable 1946 O. S. map
 Picture of French Drove and Gedney Hill station

Disused railway stations in Lincolnshire
Former Great Northern and Great Eastern Joint Railway stations
Railway stations in Great Britain opened in 1867
Railway stations in Great Britain closed in 1961